Frank Wignall (born 21 August 1939) is an English retired international footballer who played professionally for Everton, Nottingham Forest, Wolverhampton Wanderers, Derby County and Mansfield Town, as well as at international level with England. He later became player-manager of King's Lynn. After a spell with the Qatar national team, In July 1981 he was appointed manager of Shepshed Charterhouse.

Club career
Wignall signed for Nottingham Forest from Everton in 1963 for, a then club record transfer of, about £20,000. He made his debut on 24 August 1963 against Aston Villa and scored his first goal in his second game away to Liverpool on 29 August. He was Forest's top scorer during his first two seasons there with 21 goals in the 1963–64 season and 16 goals in the 1964–65 season.  His last competitive appearance was in the FA Cup at Leeds United on 17 February 1968. 

Wignall played for Derby County between 1969 and 1971, and began the 1971–72 season playing regularly, scoring 5 goals in 11 league appearances. However he was transferred to Mansfield Town late in 1971 and Derby went on to win the First Division title that season in his absence.

International career
Wignall played twice for England as a centre forward. He scored his two international goals on his England debut against Wales at Wembley Stadium in a 2–1 victory on 18 November 1964. His second and final game for England was in a 1–1 draw away to the Netherlands. Wignall believed that he might have made the England squad for the 1966 FIFA World Cup, had he not broken his leg, saying that "I was in the England team and Geoff Hurst took my position. All because I broke me leg".

References

1939 births
Living people
English footballers
English football managers
England international footballers
Chorley F.C. players
Everton F.C. players
Nottingham Forest F.C. players
Wolverhampton Wanderers F.C. players
Derby County F.C. players
Mansfield Town F.C. players
King's Lynn F.C. players
Qatar national football team managers
Expatriate football managers in Qatar
People from Blackrod
Leigh Genesis F.C. players
English expatriate football managers
English Football League players
English Football League representative players
Burton Albion F.C. players
King's Lynn F.C. managers
Association football forwards